The Co-Cathedral of Our Lady of Assumption or simply Cathedral of Our Lady of the Assumption, is the co-cathedral church of the Archdiocese of Fort-de-France, is located in Saint-Pierre, on the island of Martinique, a dependency of France in the Caribbean Sea.

The first church was built in 1654, it was a private chapel and is in the district of Mouillage. The tower of the chapel and the bell were destroyed during a British bombardment of the port of Saint-Pierre, in 1667. In 1675 the reconstruction of the church was proposed.

Notre-Dame-du-Bon-Port was opened in 1859. A new restoration of the main facade was begun in 1861 and neoclassical facade gave way to a baroque facade. The work concluded with the construction of the two towers of the facade and bell tower in 1885. The building was damaged by the 1902 eruption.

A new building was built using old stones with the addition of volcanic rocks and bricks. The co-cathedral was dedicated to Our Lady of the Assumption and received new bells in 1925.

See also
Roman Catholicism in France
Co-Cathedral

References

Roman Catholic cathedrals in Martinique